The 1890 Tennessee gubernatorial election was held on November 4, 1890. Incumbent Democratic Governor Robert Love Taylor did not seek re-election. Democratic nominee John P. Buchanan defeated Republican nominee Lewis T. Baxter and Prohibition nominee D. C. Kelley with 56.57% of the vote.

Nominations
Nominations were made by party conventions.

Democratic nomination
The Democratic convention was held on July 15 to 18 at Nashville. John P. Buchanan was nominated by acclamation on the twenty-sixth ballot.

Candidate
John P. Buchanan, President of the Tennessee Farmers' Alliance

Withdrew

Jere Baxter, businessman (withdrew during 26th ballot)
Josiah Patterson, former State Representative (withdrew during 26th ballot)
John May Taylor, former U.S. Representative (withdrew after 23rd ballot)

Results

Partial results of the balloting were as follows (excluding fractions).

Republican nomination
The Republican convention was held on July 30 at Nashville. Lewis T. Baxter was nominated by acclamation.

Candidate
Lewis T. Baxter, banker

General election

Candidates
Lewis T. Baxter, Republican
John P. Buchanan, Democratic
Rev. David C. Kelley, Prohibition

Results

References

Bibliography
 

1890
Tennessee
Gubernatorial
November 1890 events